Mary Boio Fowler (born 14 February 2003) is an Australian soccer player who plays for Women's Super League club Manchester City and the Australian national team. Mainly a forward, she is also capable to play as a midfielder.

Early life 
Mary Boio Fowler was born on 14 February 2003 in Cairns, Queensland.

Club career

Adelaide United
Fowler made her W-League debut for Adelaide United in the first game of the 2019–20 season. She scored her first goal in that game in a 2–1 loss against Western Sydney Wanderers.

Montpellier
In January 2020, Fowler signed for French Ligue 1 club Montpellier HSC on a 3-year contract after an undisclosed transfer fee was paid.  She made her debut against Olympique Lyonnais in February 2020.  The French league was subsequently abandoned after the onset of the COVID-19 pandemic in France. 

The 2020–21 season saw the young striker received significant playing time. As of 1 June 2021 she had made 22 appearances for her club, starting 15 of them and scoring 5 goals. 

She was named to ESPN's 21 under 21, an international list of footballers representing the next generation of talent, in May 2021.

Manchester City
In June 2022, Fowler signed a four-year contract with English FA WSL club Manchester City.

International career

2018 Tournament of Nations
In 2018, Fowler was added to the Australian squad for the Tournament of Nations. She made her debut late in the game against Brazil, thus becoming the fifth youngest player for the Matildas at 15 years and 162 days. She was again used as a substitute in Australia's friendlies against England and France later in the year, but was unavailable for the matches against Chile to attend trials with the first teams of Chelsea, West Ham and Manchester City, who all wanted to sign her. She also attended sprint and power training sessions in Manchester with coach Mick Clegg.

Fowler has received wide praise for her abilities as a player, with coach Alen Stajcic said that she has "probably got the most weapons I've seen from a young player her age in women's football".

2019 FIFA Women's World Cup
Fowler was called up to the Australian squad for the 2019 FIFA Women's World Cup.

2020 Summer Olympics
Fowler was selected to the Australian squad for the 2020 Summer Olympics. She made her Olympic debut as a substitute in a Group G match against New Zealand. The Matildas advanced to the quarter-finals with one victory and a draw in the group stage. In the quarter-finals against Great Britain, which ended in a 4–3 win for Australia after extra time, Fowler scored a goal in the 104th minute. However, they lost 1–0 to Sweden in the semi-finals and lost 4–3 in the bronze medal match to the United States.

Personal life
Fowler's father is originally from the Republic of Ireland and her mother is from Papua New Guinea. Her siblings are also talented soccer players, with her brother Caoimhin and sister Ciara both having played for Irish youth teams. Ciara has also played for the Australian under-20 team.

Fowler began her professional career together with Ciara when they were both signed by Adelaide United in the same year. They played together professionally for the first time in the first match of the 2019–20 season when Ciara came on as an 85th-minute substitute. This was the debut for both sisters.

Career statistics

Club

International

Scores and results list Australia's goal tally first, score column indicates score after each Fowler goal.

Notes

References

External links
 

2003 births
Living people
Australian women's soccer players
Australia women's international soccer players
Women's association football forwards
Adelaide United FC (A-League Women) players
Montpellier HSC (women) players
Manchester City W.F.C. players
2019 FIFA Women's World Cup players
Australian expatriate women's soccer players
Australian expatriate sportspeople in France
Expatriate women's footballers in France
Australian expatriate sportspeople in England
Australian people of Irish descent
Australian people of Papua New Guinean descent
Sportspeople from Cairns
Soccer players from Queensland
Footballers at the 2020 Summer Olympics
Olympic soccer players of Australia
Sportswomen from Queensland
Women's Super League players
Expatriate women's footballers in England
Expatriate women's footballers in the Netherlands
Australian expatriate sportspeople in the Netherlands